Jonah Radebaugh (Serbian Cyrillic: Џона Радебу; romanized: Džona Radebu; born June 17, 1997) is an American-born naturalized Montenegrin professional basketball player for Valencia of the Spanish Liga ACB and the EuroLeague. He played college basketball for Northern Colorado.

Early life and high school career
Radebaugh began playing basketball at the age of five. He attended Northglenn High School in Northglenn, Colorado. As a senior, Radebaugh averaged 18 points per game and was named East Metro Athletic Conference (EMAC) Player of the Year. Northglenn lost to Grand Junction High School 65–57 in the second round of the Class 5A playoffs despite 26 points from Radebaugh. He decided to attend the University of Northern Colorado over an offer of guaranteed playing time at Division III Nebraska Wesleyan University.

College career
Radebaugh walked on to the Northern Colorado Bears men's basketball team and redshirted his true freshman season. He averaged 7.6 points, 5.5 rebounds and 1.1 steals per game as a redshirt freshman. Radebaugh earned Big Sky Defensive Player of the Year honors and was placed on scholarship. As a sophomore, he averaged 7.9 points, 6.0 rebounds, and 1.0 steal per game. On February 7, 2019, Radebaugh scored a career-high 28 points shooting 5-of-6 from three-point range, and grabbed eight rebounds in an 80–62 win over Portland State. He averaged 9.5 points, 6.1 rebounds and 2.4 assists per game as a junior, earning Big Sky Defensive Player of the Year honors. Radebaugh scored a season-high 26 points and added six assists, five rebounds and four steals on December 17, 2019, in an 86–64 win over Denver. As a senior, Radebaugh averaged 16.5 points, 6.5 assists, 6.3 rebounds and 1.5 steals per game, leading Northern Colorado to a 22–9 record. He was named Big Sky Defensive Player of the Year for a record third season and garnered First Team All-Big Sky as well as NABC All-District 6 team honors.

Professional career
On September 15, 2020, Radebaugh signed his first professional contract with Köping Stars of the Swedish Basketball League.

On December 15, Radebaugh chose to take advantage of a clause that made it possible to break the contract with Stars if a team from abroad wanted him. He signed a try-out contract with Ludwigsburg, second in the German Bundesliga season 2019/2020. On December 29, Radebaugh played his first game with the team, and recorded 6 points in 10 minutes in a win against Hamburg. On January 2, 2021, Radebaugh got a permanent deal with ”the Giants” until the end of the season.

On June 30, 2022, Radebaugh signed with Lenovo Tenerife of the Spanish Liga ACB.

On July 18, 2022, Valencia Basket announce the signing of Radebaugh, after executing the exit clause valid for Euroleague teams.

Personal life
Radebaugh has two older brothers: Jarred and Jordan, and a younger sister Hannah. Jonah began wearing his hair in a mullet in high school. In addition to basketball, he student taught while at Northern Colorado.His best friends are Jaime Estrella, Jacob Montour, and Romano Jesus III

References

External links
Northern Colorado Bears bio

1997 births
Living people
American men's basketball players
American expatriate basketball people in Germany
American expatriate basketball people in Sweden
Basketball players from Colorado
Northern Colorado Bears men's basketball players
People from Thornton, Colorado
Riesen Ludwigsburg players
Shooting guards